Ewiges Eis – 15 Jahre Eisbrecher (German for "Eternal Ice – 15 Years of Eisbrecher") is the sole greatest hits album by German  Neue Deutsche Härte band Eisbrecher. Released to commemorate the 15th anniversary of the band, it consists of two discs with their greatest hits & some remixes. The release was also accompanied by a brief tour to promote the album.

Track listing

Charts

References

Eisbrecher albums
2018 albums
German-language albums